XHVOZ-FM is a radio station on 107.5 FM in Guadalajara, Jalisco. The station is operated by Grupo Audiorama and carries an electronic music format known as "Vibe FM".

History
XHVOZ received its first concession on October 2, 1979. It was owned by Radiodifusoras y Televisoras del Noreste, S.A. de C.V. and initially operated by Promomedios. Its assigned call sign, never used, was XHGR-FM.

In 2015, Organización PRAM was replaced by Radio Emisora XHSP-FM as the concessionaire as part of a restructuring of the stations then owned by Grupo Radio México. GRM merged with corporate cousin Grupo Radio Centro in 2016.

In November 2021 dropped La Z, become Vibe FM an electronic format Grupo Audiorama.

References

Radio stations in Guadalajara
Radio stations established in 1979